GTC may refer to:

Education
 General Teaching Council (disambiguation)
 Gateway Technical College, in Wisconsin, United States
 Green Templeton College, Oxford, a constituent college of the University of Oxford
 Greenville Technical College, in South Carolina, United States
 Griffin Technical College, now part of Southern Crescent Technical College, in Georgia, United States
 Gwinnett Technical College, in Georgia, United States
 Government Tolaram College, in Narayanganj, Bangladesh

Legal 
 General Terms & Conditions, also referred to as "General T&Cs" or simply "T&Cs" or "GTCs", are the General "boiler plate" conditions added as an annex to a contractual agreement. GTCs are commonly found in the back of a rental, sales or service contract.
 General Terms and Conditions, a translation from the German legal phrase Allgemeine Geschäftsbedingungen

Science and medicine 
 Generalised tonic-clonic seizure
 Graceful tree conjecture
 Gran Telescopio Canarias, a Spanish telescope
 Gigatonnes of carbon (GtC)
 GTC, a codon for the amino acid valine

Technology 
 Game time card, in online gaming
 Genome Therapeutics Corporation, a defunct American biotech company
 GPU Technology Conference, an annual technical conference started by Nvidia in 2009
 Opel GTC, a concept car
 General Technologies Corp., a Canadian manufacturer of diagnostic and test equipment for vehicles
 Giant Tech Companies, big technology companies like Facebook, Google, etc

Telecommunications 
 Generic Token Card, in wireless and point-to-point communications
 Grameen Telecom, a Bangladeshi telecommunications company
 GTC Wireless, an American telecommunications company

Other uses
 Gauhati Town Club, an Indian sports club
 General Trade Company, a defunct Dano-Norwegian trading company
 GeTai Challenge, abbreviated as GTC, a Singaporean reality singing competition for getai singers organised by MediaCorp
 Girls' Training Corps, a former British girls' voluntary organisation
 Going to California (TV series)
 Good 'til cancelled, an investment order
 Gran Turismo Concept, a video game
 Sasol GTC Championship, a South African motorsport championship
 Grand Traverse County, in Michigan, United States
 Grand Trunk Corporation, a Canadian National Railway subsidiary
 Ground Training Competition, of the Royal Air Force
 Grudge Training Center, a mixed martial arts training center in Colorado, United States
 Ground Transportation Center, a transit center within an airport providing ground transportation, such as buses, trains, taxies, to the city
 Guild of Television Camera Professionals an organisation for professional camera people